Ahmed Al-Mulaifi  was a member of the Kuwaiti National Assembly, representing the third district. Born in 1956, Al-Mulaifi worked as a lawyer before being elected to the National Assembly in 1996.

Dispute with MP Al-Enezi
On September 4, 2008, MP Khalaf Al-Enezi blasted Al-Mulaifi for criticizing Prime Minister Nasser Mohammed Al-Ahmed Al-Sabah.  Al-Mulaifi had attacked the Prime Minister for planning a trip to the United States and the United Nations at a time when "there are plenty of tense and complicated issues domestically."

Protested Against Israeli Attacks
On December 28, 2008, Kuwaiti lawmakers Marzouq Al-Ghanim, Jaaman Al-Harbash, Ahmad Al-Mulaifi, Mohammad Hayef Al-Mutairi, Ahmad Al-Saadoun, Nasser Al-Sane, Waleed Al-Tabtabaie, Mikhled Al-Azmi and Musallam Al-Barrak protested in front of the National Assembly building against the attacks by Israel on Gaza.  Protesters burned Israeli flags, waved banners reading, "No to hunger, no to submission" and chanted "Allahu Akbar". Israel launched air strikes against Hamas in the Gaza Strip on December 26 after a six-month ceasefire ended on December 18.

References

Members of the National Assembly (Kuwait)
Living people
1956 births